The Jackson House is a historic house at 1617 North Jordan Lane in Fayetteville, Arkansas.  It is a -story L-shaped brick building, three bays wide, with a cross gable roof and a single-story ell extending to the north.  A single-story portico shelters the main entrance of the south-facing facade, supported by two square columns, with a balustrade above.  A small round window is located in the gable end of the main facade.  The east elevation (which faces the street, has two segmented-arch windows on each level.  The house was built in 1866 by Columbus Jackson, whose family lineage is said to include President Andrew Jackson.

The property has now been subdivided, and the house stands in a modern subdivision.

See also
National Register of Historic Places listings in Washington County, Arkansas

References

Houses on the National Register of Historic Places in Arkansas
Houses completed in 1866
Houses in Fayetteville, Arkansas
1866 establishments in Arkansas
National Register of Historic Places in Fayetteville, Arkansas
Slave cabins and quarters in the United States